Max Blagg is a British-born poet, writer, and performer from England. Blagg has performed in New York City since 1971. He is currently a visiting lecturer in poetry at The New School in New York City (continuous from 2005).

Life
Max Blagg was born in 1948 at Retford, England, where he was a childhood friend of the actor Philip Jackson.

Blagg moved to New York City in 1971, and still lives there today. He was recognized as an influential performer, respected writer, and poet in the New York literary scene.

In 1992, his poem "What Fits?" was the soundtrack to a commercial for Gap jeans.

Works
The venues where Blagg has performed include the Kitchen, Guggenheim Museum, Jackie 60, Cable gallery, Nuyorican's Poet's café, St Marks Church, Bowery Poetry Club, CBGB, Sybarite, KGB Bar, Performing Garage, Mudd Club, and many other cultural landmarks.

Magazines published in: 
Bomb
Shiny
Lacanian Ink
Interview
Village  Voice
Night
Verbal Abuse
Bald Ego
Open City
Black Book
Room 101
The East Hampton Star
Sensitive Skin Magazine

Film Appearances:
"Total Recall"  June 11, 2007

Newspapers published in:
New York Times, "I Am The Chelsea Hotel". April 30, 2006

Books:
From Here to Maternity (Disco Version) Aloes Books/Hotel Firbank, 1980
From Here to Maternity - Aloes Books London 1982
Monkey - Appearances 18 (special issue) 1991
Licking the Fun Up - Aloes Books London 1991
Pink Instrument - Lumen Boston 1998
Eat a Peach  - (privately printed) 2006
Up is Up and So is Down NYC Writing and Art from the 80's. edited by Brandon Stosuy, New York Press, 2006
What Love Sees in the Distance - Open City Books 2008
Ticket Out (2013)

References

External links
 New School.edu – The New School, NYC
 "Max Blagg's "Autobio A Gogo"" at About.com
 "The Best Night of His Life," a short story at Sensitive Skin magazine
 “Video in Manhattan”

Poets from New York (state)
People from Retford
New York School poets
Spoken word poets
1949 births
Living people
English emigrants to the United States
American male poets
English male poets